Mao Anying (24 October 1922 – 25 November 1950) was the eldest son of Mao Zedong and Yang Kaihui.

Educated in Moscow and a veteran of multiple wars, Mao was killed in action by an air strike during the Korean War.

Early life 

Mao was born at Central South University Xiangya Hospital in Changsha, Hunan Province. His mother, Yang Kaihui, second wife of Communist Leader Mao Zedong, was executed by the Kuomintang in 1930. He and his younger brother, Mao Anqing, escaped to Shanghai. Their father was in Jiangxi province at the time, and they were enrolled into the Datong Kindergarten, which was run covertly by the Chinese Communist Party for the children of CCP leaders and operated by Dong Jianwu (董健吾) under the alias "Pastor Wang". In 1933, after the Kuomintang expulsion of the CCP from Jianxi Soviet, support for the Datong Kindergarten dried up and Mao and his brother ended up on the streets.

World War II 

In 1936, Mao was located by Dong and Kang Sheng and taken to Moscow, where he was enrolled with his brother Anqing at Interdom in the Soviet Union under the name "Sergei Yun Fu". His stepmother, He Zizhen would join them there after being wounded in battle; despite the fact that Mao's father had left his mother for He, Anying had a good relationship with her and his-half sister Li Min who joined them in 1941.

During the Second World War, Anying successfully petitioned Joseph Stalin to allow him and his brother Anqing to join the Soviet Red Army. Mao graduated from the Frunze Military Academy and the Lenin Military-Political Academy in 1943 and served as a deputy politics department commander of a tank platoon for the 1st Belorussian Front in the fight against the Third Reich in Poland, Czechoslovakia, and the final Battle of Berlin.

Following VE Day, Anying was re-assigned to the Soviet Far East, where he took part in the Soviet-Japanese War. During the Manchurian Strategic Offensive Operation, he was praised for role during military operations in the Chahar Province and in the Greater Khingan Range, for which he received the Soviet military decorations of the Order of the Red Star and the Medal "For Battle Merit".

In 1946, Mao returned to Yan'an, where he served under Kang Sheng in fighting against the Kuomintang and defeating them in the Shanxi Province, reaching the rank of Major General in the Peoples Liberation Army. Upon his return to Beijing, Mao became a Secretary and Translator for Li Kenong in the CCP's intelligence bureau, the Central Social Affairs Department (SAD), and also the Deputy Secretary of the CCP Branch for the Beijing General Machinery Factory.

Korean War and death 
In June 1950, Mao requested to join the Chinese People's Volunteer Army (PVA) as an officer in the Korean War. PVA commander Peng Dehuai and other high-ranking officers, fearing Mao Zedong's reaction if his favorite son was to be killed in combat, had long opposed allowing Mao to join the PVA and tried to prevent him from entering. Mao Zedong overrode Peng, who allegedly shouted, "He is Mao Zedong's son. Why should it be anything else?" Peng instead had Mao assigned to himself as his secretary and Russian translator, under the pseudonym "Secretary Liu" at the PVA headquarters, located in caves near an old gold mining settlement in Tongchang County. This location offered excellent protection from UN air attacks and was far from the front lines of the war. However, the safety was an illusion, as the airspace was completely controlled by the US Air Force. 
 
On the evening of 24 November, two United Nations (UN) aircraft, P-61s on a photo reconnaissance mission, were seen overhead. According to multiple Chinese eyewitnesses, sometime between 10:00 am and noon on 25 November, four Douglas A-26 Invaders dropped napalm bombs in the area. One of the bombs destroyed a makeshift building near the caves, killing Mao and another officer, Gao Ruixin. Several conflicting reasons have been given as to why Mao was in the building, including suggestions that he was cooking food during daylight, in violation of Chinese Army regulations, fetching documents, or sleeping late due to night duties, which had led to him missing breakfast. Another reason given was that due to the high amount of communications, being the PVA headquarters, the Americans were able to combine aerial reconnaissance with the direction of radio waves, to identify its location.

Peng witnessed the explosion nearby and realizing that Mao was in danger, tried to run towards him but was physically restrained by his fiercely loyal guards. Peng screamed "if you don't let go, I'll kill you!" to which the guard responded "if you kill me, I still won't let go". Mao's body was reportedly burnt beyond recognition and was only identifiable through a Soviet watch given to him by Joseph Stalin. Peng immediately reported Mao's death to the Central Military Commission, but Zhou Enlai, Liu Shaoqi, and Yang Shangkun ordered the CMC and Politburo not to inform Mao Zedong. It was only in January 1951, when Mao Zedong asked his personal secretary Ye Zilong to have Mao transferred back to China, that Ye informed him of the news. Mao had been buried in Pyongyang, in the Cemetery for the Heroes of the Chinese People's Volunteer Army. Some sources claim that Peng Dehuai's fall from grace after the Great Leap Forward and subsequent persecution during the Cultural Revolution was connected to Mao Anying's death, for which Mao Zedong supposedly held Peng responsible.

Disputes regarding death 
The only unit operating the A-26 in Korea at the time was the 3rd Bomb Group, of the United States Air Force (USAF). Some accounts have claimed, most likely incorrectly, that the pilot responsible was Captain G. B. Lipawsky of the South African Air Force. However, the only aircraft flown by South African pilots in Korea was the Mustang fighter bomber, which was unlikely to have been mistaken for the larger, twin-engine A-26s.

Some Chinese citizens who oppose Mao Zedong commemorate the anniversary of Mao Anying's death by eating egg fried rice. According to some accounts, on the morning of November 25, 1950 Mao Anying had overslept, once awake, he stole eggs from the general's supplies to cook egg fried rice for himself despite orders that staff were only to cook at night for fear of American air raids. It is alleged that his preparation of that meal drew the attention of American bombers, contributing to his demise.

Egg fried rice protests are a form of internet protest used by Chinese users occurring yearly around October 24, Anying's birthday, or around November 25, the date of his death. Posting recipes for egg fried rice is done as a subtle jab at the death of Anying during the Korean War; such posts are usually blocked or taken down by Chinese officials and can lead to sanctions against those involved.

See also 

 Yakov Dzhugashvili
 Chiang Wei-kuo

References 

1922 births
1950 deaths
Children of national leaders of China
Mao Zedong family
Chinese people of World War II
Chinese military personnel of the Korean War
Soviet military personnel of World War II
Chinese expatriates in the Soviet Union
Chinese military personnel killed in the Korean War
Frunze Military Academy alumni
Deaths by American airstrikes
People from Changsha
People of the Republic of China
National Heroes of North Korea
Recipients of the Order of the Red Star
Foreign Communist Party of the Soviet Union members